Compulsive Liar is a Canadian comedy film, directed by Émile Gaudreault and released in 2019. The film stars Louis-José Houde as Simon, a man who is confronted by his family about his lifelong habit of being a compulsive liar, and denies it; but he then wakes up the next day in an alternate reality in which all of his past lies have become the truth, forcing him to correct all of his lies with the help of his brother Phil (Antoine Bertrand) in order to reset everything back to normal.

The cast also includes Véronique Le Flaguais, Anne-Élisabeth Bossé, Geneviève Schmidt, Catherine Chabot, Denise Filiatrault, Johanne-Marie Tremblay and Sonia Vachon.

The film premiered in theatres on July 10, 2019, and had the biggest opening weekend for a Québécois film in 2019. As of the week of August 15 it had surpassed $5 million at the box office, and had already reached the status of Quebec's 13th highest-grossing film of all time.

The film ended 2019 as the year's top-grossing Canadian film, and received the Golden Screen Award at the 8th Canadian Screen Awards.

It received three Prix Iris nominations at the 22nd Quebec Cinema Awards in 2020, for Best Supporting Actress (Schmidt), Revelation of the Year (Chabot) and the Public Prize.

References

External links
 
 Menteur at Library and Archives Canada

2019 films
Canadian comedy films
Films shot in Quebec
Films set in Quebec
Films directed by Émile Gaudreault
French-language Canadian films
2010s Canadian films